The Ogre District was an administrative division of Latvia, located in the Semigallia and Vidzeme regions, in the country's centre. It was situated about 37 km east of the capital Riga. The principal city was Ogre with around 30 000 inhabitants.

Districts were eliminated during the administrative-territorial reform in 2009.

Cities and towns
Ikšķile
Ķegums
Lielvārde
Ogre

Districts of Latvia